Nohai means "dog" in Mongolian language. People with this name:

Nogai Khan, Mongol general of the Golden Horde and descendant of Chinggis Khan
Qara-Nogai, Ilkhanid commander in the 13th century